Sammy Walker may refer to:

Sammy Walker (American football) (born 1969), American football player
Sammy Walker (ice hockey) (born 1999), American ice hockey player
Sammy Walker (singer) (born 1952), American singer-songwriter